Charles Albert Shone Conwell (born November 2, 1997) is an American professional boxer. As an amateur he competed in the men's middleweight event at the 2016 Summer Olympics.

Professional career 
On October 12, 2019, Conwell fought Patrick Day. In what was supposed to be a competitive fight, Conwell managed to get the better of Day, dropping him three times in rounds four, eight and ten. The third knockdown was the most devastating out of all, with Conwell catching his opponent with a big right hand behind the ear, followed by a sweeping left hook that immediately sent Day to the canvas in brutal fashion. Day was reported to be unconscious and suffered a seizure on the way to the hospital. A few days after, it was announced that Patrick Day had succumbed to his injuries and died.

In his next fight, Conwell defeated Ramses Agaton in dominant fashion, forcing the referee to stop the fight after the end of the fourth round. After taking a lot of punishment from the start, Agaton didn't look good, and after consulting the ringside physician the referee stopped the fight and Conwell got the victory.

In his next fight, Conwell squared off against Wendy Toussaint. Conwell boxed well in the opening rounds. In round seven, he hurt his hand which gave him a lot of pain, but two rounds after it would be that same hand that would end the fight. Conwell landed a vicious uppercut on Toussaint, breaking his nose and forcing him to forfeit.

In April 2021, Conwell had to withdraw from his fight with Ivan Golub reportedly from a hand injury. Conwell later told ESPN that he faked the hand injury on allegedly his managers advice.

Professional boxing record

References

External links
 
Charles Conwell - Profile, News Archive & Current Rankings at Box.Live

1997 births
Living people
American male boxers
Olympic boxers of the United States
Boxers at the 2016 Summer Olympics
Boxers from Detroit
Middleweight boxers